Mean Machine may refer to:

Music 
 Mean Machine (Lucifer's Friend album)
 Mean Machine (U.D.O. album)
 Mean Machine (band), a Japanese rock band
 The Mean Machine (rap group)
 "Mean Machine", a song by The Last Poets on the album This Is Madness
 "Mean Machine," a song by Sugar Ray on the album Lemonade and Brownies
 "Mean Machine," a song by Motörhead on the album Orgasmatron
 The Mean Machine (album), an album by Jimmy McGriff

Sport 
 Mean Machine (sailing team)
 Roy Shaw (1936–2012), British boxer
 Mean Machine RFC, a rugby club in the Kenya Rugby Football Union
 Football teams in The Longest Yard, and its 2005 remake
 A 1982 Commonwealth Games relay team including Graeme Brewer, Neil Brooks, Greg Fasala, and Michael Delany

Other uses 
 Mean Machine (film), a 2001 British sports comedy film
 Mean Machine Angel, a character in the Judge Dredd universe
 "Mean Machine," a Hi Hi Puffy AmiYumi episode
 The Mean Machine, Dick Dastardly's car in the TV series Wacky Races